Galipea ossana was a species of plant in the family Rutaceae. It was endemic to Cuba.

Sources
 

ossana
Extinct plants
Taxonomy articles created by Polbot
Taxobox binomials not recognized by IUCN